Gabriel Demian (born 4 December 2004) is a Slovak footballer who plays for Dukla Banská Bystrica as a midfielder.

Club career
Demian made his Fortuna Liga debut for FC Nitra against MFK Zemplín Michalovce on 22 May 2021.
He signed a contract with MFK Dukla Banská Bystrica at the end of January 2023.

References

External links
 MFK Dukla Banská Bystrica official club profile 
 Futbalnet profile 
 
 

2004 births
Living people
People from Levice
Sportspeople from the Nitra Region
Slovak footballers
Association football midfielders
FC Nitra players
MFK Dukla Banská Bystrica players
Slovak Super Liga players
Expatriate footballers in Germany